Albie Hecht is a film and television producer and media executive. In 1997, Hecht was the president of film and TV entertainment for Nickelodeon before becoming president of the television channel Spike TV in 2003. In 2005, he founded and was CEO of the digital studio Worldwide Biggies. From 2013 to 2015, he also served as general manager of the TV channel, HLN, and currently serves as chief content officer of PocketWatch.

Biography
Born to a Jewish family, Hecht graduated from Francis Lewis High School in Queens, New York City where he played varsity basketball and baseball and was President of the Student Organization. He was Director of Artist Relations at Terry Cashman's and Tommy West's Lifesong Records in the 1970s, where he oversaw the career of Crack the Sky and then became manager to pop star Dean Friedman. In 1988, he ran productions for the advertising agency Fred/Alan Inc with Alan Goodman and Fred Seibert. Together, they established Chauncey Street Productions for their independent television productions. Through Chauncey Street, Hecht co-created and executive produced Kids Court and GUTS for Nickelodeon, the Ace Award winning game show Turn it Up! for MTV and The Talent Pool for Comedy Central, which featured the TV debut of John Leguizamo.

At Nickelodeon, Hecht oversaw the development and production of SpongeBob SquarePants, Dora the Explorer, Blue's Clues, and such live-action shows as All That, Kenan and Kel and The Naked Brothers Band. He also co-created and executive produced the Nickelodeon Kids' Choice Awards, and built the Nick Digital Studio in New York and the Nick animation studio in Los Angeles.

In movies, Hecht produced films for Paramount including Lemony Snicket's A Series of Unfortunate Events. The SpongeBob SquarePants Movie, The Rugrats Movie and the Oscar nominated animated feature Jimmy Neutron: Boy Genius.

At Spike TV, his shows included The Joe Schmo Show, MXC and signing the Ultimate Fighting Championship franchise.

In 2005, Hecht co-founded Shine Global with his wife Susan MacLaury, Shine Global is a nonprofit media company that gives voice to children and their families by telling stories of resilience to raise awareness, promote action, inspire change. Through Shine, Hecht produced the Oscar winning short documentary Inocente and the Emmy winning and  Oscar nominated documentary feature War/Dance.

In 2017, Hecht joined Pocket.watch as Chief Content Officer. Pocket.watch is a new studio creating global franchises from the YouTube stars characters loved by generation alpha. Hecht is the creator and Executive Producer of Ryan's Mystery Playdate on Nick Jr., the number one preschool show on TV. He also produced the HobbyKids Adventures, an animated series which streams on the Hobby Kids TV YouTube channel. The show has received over 30 million views of its episodes to date.

References

External links
 
 

Living people
American chief executives
American Jews
Nickelodeon executives
American film producers
Year of birth missing (living people)
Francis Lewis High School alumni